"Toy" is a song recorded by Israeli singer Netta Barzilai. Written by Doron Medalie and the song's producer Stav Beger, the song was released on 11 March 2018 along with its official music video clip, which was directed by Keren Hochma. It is best known as Israel's winning entry at the Eurovision Song Contest 2018 held in Lisbon, Portugal. The song was leaked online a day before the official release.

The song marks Israel's fourth Eurovision win along with 1978, 1979 and 1998, having won with 529 points. The song reached the top of the charts in Israel.

The song held the title of the most viewed video on Eurovision Song Contest's YouTube channel until it was surpassed by Russia's 2020 entry "Uno" in July 2020.

The song is featured in the game Just Dance 2019.

Lyrics
The song's lyrics are mostly in English, with the exception of the Hebrew phrase  (ani lo buba, "I am not a doll"), and the slang word  (stefa, meaning a pile of banknotes). The Japanese word baka ( "stupid") is also used extensively and the Pokémon character Pikachu is used once. "Trump-pam-pau" refers to the then-President of the United States, Donald Trump, as Doron Medalie revealed in April 2019 to the Israeli media.

Eurovision Song Contest

"Toy" was first drawn to compete at the first semi-final of the Eurovision Song Contest 2018, in which it was performed seventh in a field of nineteen songs, and achieved first place, based on a combination of fourth placing from televote and first from jury. It thus qualified for the final, under a format progressing the top ten most-voted songs from each semi-final. In the final the song was performed 22nd in a field of 26, and won, based on third placing with 212 points from the jury and winning the televote with 317 points, achieving overall first place with a combined score of 529 points which Israel later won hosting rights for 2019 in Tel Aviv.

Critical reception
Charlotte Runcie of The Daily Telegraph awarded the song five stars out of five, describing it as "gloriously bizarre pop" with "playful lyrics and a powerful vocal performance".

Allegations were made that the performance of the song at Eurovision featured appropriation of Japanese cultural imagery as a "prop", including Netta wearing a kimono and buns, and the performance's staging featuring Maneki-nekos—a Japanese symbol of luck. Netta did not respond to the allegations, but did state in previous interviews that she was a follower of Japanese popular culture, particularly the Pokémon franchise.

In 2022, Ben Kelly of The Independent named it 39th best Eurovision-winning song of all time.

Copyright claim

On 3 July 2018, Israeli infotainer Guy Pines reported that Universal Music Group may file a lawsuit claiming "Toy" similarities in rhythm and harmony with The White Stripes' song "Seven Nation Army". Universal sent a pre-suit notice letter to the songwriters Doron Medalie and Stav Beger, claiming copyright infringement. In February 2019 the Israeli composers agreed to give writing credit to Jack White, and a share in the royalties for the song. Medalie and Beger had reportedly agreed to give Universal some of the song's distribution rights in certain territories, potentially exposing the song to an even larger audience.

Credits and personnel
Recording and management
Recorded at Stav Beger Studios (Tel Aviv)
Published by Tedy Productions and Unicell

Personnel
Netta – vocals, loop arrangements
Doron Medalie – composition
Stav Beger – composition, production, percussion, mixing and mastering
Jack White – composition
Avshalom Ariel – loop arrangements
Ami Ben Abu – keyboards
Shimon Yihye – guitars
Daniel Rubin, Maayan Bukris and Liron Carakukly – background vocals

Charts

Weekly charts

Year-end charts

Decade-end charts

Certifications

Notes

References

External links
 

2018 singles
2018 songs
Eurovision Song Contest winning songs
Eurovision songs of 2018
Eurovision songs of Israel
Number-one singles in Israel

Songs written by Doron Medalie
Songs involved in plagiarism controversies
Songs written by Jack White
Netta Barzilai songs